Wronowice  is a village in the administrative district of Gmina Łask, within Łask County, Łódź Voivodeship, in central Poland.

The village has a population of 430.

History
Some Polish farmers from Wronowice were among the victims of a massacre of 30 Poles perpetrated by German soldiers in Chechło near Pabianice on September 8, 1939 during the German invasion of Poland which started World War II (see Nazi crimes against the Polish nation).

References

Villages in Łask County